Penny Singleton (born Mariana Dorothy McNulty, September 15, 1908 – November 12, 2003) was an American actress and labor leader. During her 60-year career on stage, screen, radio and television, Singleton appeared as the comic-strip heroine Blondie Bumstead in a series of 28 motion pictures from 1938 until 1950 and the popular Blondie radio program from 1939 until 1950. Singleton also provided the voice of Jane Jetson in the animated series The Jetsons from 1962 to 1963.

Behind the scenes, Singleton was the first woman to serve as president of an AFL-CIO union, and served two terms as president of the American Guild of Variety Artists. She testified before a Senate subcommittee in 1962 on the union's treatment of women variety workers, and led a strike of the Radio City Rockettes in 1967.

Early life 
Singleton was born in Philadelphia to Bernard J. "Benny" McNulty and Mary Dorothy McNulty. She began performing professionally as a child, and only completed sixth grade in her schooling.

Career 

Singleton sang at a silent movie theater, and toured in vaudeville as part of an act called "The Kiddie Kabaret". She sang and danced with Milton Berle, whom she had known since childhood, and actor Gene Raymond, and appeared on Broadway in Jack Benny's The Great Temptations.  She also toured nightclubs and in roadshows of plays and musicals.

Singleton appeared as a nightclub singer in After the Thin Man, credited as Dorothy McNulty. She was cast opposite Arthur Lake (as Dagwood) in the feature film Blondie in 1938, based on the comic strip by Chic Young. They repeated their roles on a radio comedy beginning in 1939 and in guest appearances on other radio shows. As Dagwood and Blondie Bumstead, they proved so popular that a succession of 27 sequels was made from 1938 until 1950, with the radio show ending the same year. Singleton's husband Robert Sparks produced 12 of these sequels.  Also in 1950, she had her own program, The Penny Singleton Show, on NBC radio.

Singleton held top billing in Go West, Young Lady (1941), over her male co-star, Glenn Ford. Only two other female stars (Dorothy Page and Jane Frazee) were top-billed singing cowgirls at the time. She provided the voice of Jane Jetson in the 1962–63 animated series, The Jetsons.

Labor activism 
Singleton was active in union affairs as a vocal member of the American Guild of Variety Artists (AGVA).  She was elected president of the AGVA in 1958–1959, and again in 1969–1970. Her union membership was suspended in 1962, when she was accused of slandering some of the union's officers, and she countersued. Singleton was reinstated as a union member in 1963, after the dispute reached a legal settlement.

She testified on the exploitation of women in variety work, and the union's shortcomings in representing those workers, before a United States Senate subcommittee in 1962. "I charge here and now that the exotic and strip artists have been abandoned and made outcasts by the very union to which they pay dues for representation and protection," she announced to the subcommittee.

In 1967, she led a successful month-long strike by the Radio City Rockettes for better working conditions. During her presidency, she led negotiations with the Disney on Parade show (NAWAL Productions) during a variety artists' strike in the 1970 Disney on Parade (DOP) show – a joint venture between Walt Disney and NBC, and one of the most successful touring arena shows ever, with tours all over the world. With over 100 cast members, she led a slowdown in the performance in Hershey, Pennsylvania, followed by a walkout in Ft. Wayne, Indiana, and a settlement the next week in Houston, Texas.  
The issue was purportedly that the 16" support stage used by the dancers was cut from the show to reduce trucking costs. The stage, which was laid down on the arena floor without the support, caused the dancers to reportedly get shin splints. The strike was settled and the show went on in Houston.

Personal life and legacy
Singleton married Laurence Scroggs Singleton, a dentist, in 1937; they divorced in 1939, although she kept his surname. She remarried, to Robert C. Sparks, a Marine Corps officer and film producer, in 1941. They remained wed until his death in 1963. Singleton had two daughters, Dorothy and Susan. She was both a lifelong Catholic and Democrat.

For her contributions to both radio and the motion-picture industry, in 1960, Singleton was honored with two stars during her induction to the Hollywood Walk of Fame. Her star for radio is located at 6811 Hollywood Boulevard, and her film star is at 6547 Hollywood Boulevard.

Death
On November 12, 2003, Singleton died at the age of 95 of respiratory failure in Sherman Oaks, California. She was buried at San Fernando Cemetery.

Filmography

Features 

Credited as Dorothy McNulty 1930–1937
Belle of the Night (1930)
Good News (1930) - Flo
Love in the Rough (1930) - Virgie
Howd' Ya Like That? (1934) - Dancer
After the Thin Man (1936) - Polly Byrnes
Vogues of 1938 (1937) - Miss Violet Sims
Sea Racketeers (1937) - Florence Riley
Swing Your Lady (1938) - Cookie
Outside of Paradise (1938) - Colleen Kerrigan
Men Are Such Fools (1938) - Nancy
Racket Busters (1938) - Gladys Christie
Mr. Chump (1938) - Betty Martin
Boy Meets Girl (1938) - Peggy
Secrets of an Actress (1938) - Miss Reid
Garden of the Moon (1938) - Miss Calder
The Mad Miss Manton (1938) - Frances Glesk
Hard to Get (1938) - Hattie
Blondie (1938) - Blondie
Blondie Meets the Boss (1939) - Blondie
Blondie Takes a Vacation (1939) - Blondie
Blondie Brings Up Baby (1939) - Blondie
Blondie on a Budget (1940) - Blondie
Blondie Has Servant Trouble (1940) - Blondie
Blondie Plays Cupid (1940) - Blondie
Blondie Goes Latin (1941) - Blondie
Blondie in Society (1941) - Blondie
Go West, Young Lady (1941) - Belinda Pendergast
Blondie Goes to College (1942) - Blondie
Blondie's Blessed Event (1942) - Blondie
Blondie for Victory (1942) - Blondie
It's a Great Life (1943) - Blondie
Footlight Glamour (1943) - Blondie
Leave It to Blondie (1945) - Blondie
Life with Blondie (1945) - Blondie
Young Widow (1946) - Peg Martin
Blondie's Lucky Day (1946) - Blondie
Blondie Knows Best (1946) - Blondie
Blondie's Big Moment (1947) - Blondie
Blondie's Holiday (1947) - Blondie
Blondie in the Dough (1947) - Blondie
Blondie's Anniversary (1947) - Blondie
Blondie's Reward (1948) - Blondie
Blondie's Secret (1948) - Blondie
Blondie's Big Deal (1949) - Blondie
Blondie Hits the Jackpot (1949) - Blondie
Blondie's Hero (1950) - Blondie
Beware of Blondie (1950) - Blondie
The Best Man (scenes deleted, 1964)
Jetsons: The Movie (1990) - Jane Jetson (voice)

Sourced, to 1964, from TV Guide

Short subjects 
Belle of the Night (1930)
Campus Cinderella (1938)
Screen Snapshots Series 19, No. 1 (1939)

Television credits 
Pulitzer Prize Playhouse (1950) - Wilhelmina
Frances Farmer Presents (1958) - Belinda Pendergast
The Quick Draw McGraw Show (1959) – The Cattle Battle Rattled – Wife
The Jetsons (1962–1963, 1985–1987) - Jane Jetson (voice)
Death Valley Days (1963) - Maggie Franklin
The Twilight Zone (1964) -  Sounds and Silences- Mrs. Flemington
Murder, She Wrote (1986) – "The Perfect Foil" – Aunt Mildred
Rockin' with Judy Jetson (1988) - Jane Jetson (voice)
The Jetsons Meet the Flintstones (1989) - Jane Jetson (voice)
Hanna-Barbera's 50th: A Yabba Dabba Doo Celebration (1989) - Jane Jetson (voice)
The Funtastic World of Hanna-Barbera (1990) - Jane Jetson (voice)

Stage work 
 Sky High (1925)
 Sweetheart Time (1926)
 The Great Temptations (1926)
 Good News (1928) (replacement for Zelma O'Neal)
 Hey Nonny Nonny! (1932)
 Call Me Madam (1959)
 Never Too Late (1964)
 No, No, Nanette (1971) (replacement for Ruby Keeler)
 No, No, Nanette (1974)
 Little Me (1983)

Theme parks
 The Funtastic World of Hanna-Barbera (ride) (1990) – Jane Jetson (voice)

References

External links 

 
 
 

1908 births
2003 deaths
American film actresses
American people of Irish descent
American radio actresses
American Roman Catholics
American stage actresses
American television actresses
American voice actresses
California Democrats
Catholics from California
Catholics from Pennsylvania
Columbia Pictures contract players
Hanna-Barbera people
Nightclub performers
Pennsylvania Democrats
Vaudeville performers
20th-century American actresses
21st-century American women
20th-century Roman Catholics